Rebecca Chase Williams was a journalist and mayor of Brookhaven, Georgia.  Previously a District 1 City Councilwoman, Williams became mayor after the city's inaugural mayor, J. Max Davis, resigned in May 2015.  Prior to her public service, Williams was a distinguished ABC News journalist for more than twenty years.

Mayor Williams is the wife of Dick Williams, editor and publisher of The Dunwoody Crier, a weekly newspaper covering Dunwoody, Brookhaven, and Sandy Springs. Williams hosted the weekly Atlanta television program, The Georgia Gang for decades.
She died of cancer March 11, 2020.

References

External links
Mayor Williams' page on Brookhaven city website
The Dunwoody Crier
Dick Williams's webpage on The Georgia Gang

People from Brookhaven, Georgia
Georgia (U.S. state) city council members
Women mayors of places in Georgia (U.S. state)
American women journalists
ABC News personalities
Living people
Year of birth missing (living people)
21st-century American women